Patrick Cashman (born September 16, 1950) is an American comedian and television and radio personality based in the Seattle metropolitan area.

Early life and education
Born and raised in Bend, Oregon. He has a younger brother named Mike Cashman who was drafted by the Los Angeles Lakers, who formerly worked as a substitute teacher in the Mukilteo School District and coached the 8th grade Explorer Middle School basketball team. Cashman graduated from Bend High School in 1968 and majored in journalism and communications at the University of Portland.

Career 
After graduation, he worked in radio in Bend, Ontario, and Eugene then switched to television, where he made local commercials at KEZI.

Cashman moved to KING-TV in Seattle in 1980, where he again worked in making local commercials, including spots for the Seattle Mariners baseball team. He was a regular cast member of the long-running local comedy show Almost Live! with his co-star John Keister, as well as the announcer for Bill Nye the Science Guy. On radio, he has hosted the Pat Cashman Show, a morning drive-time show on several Seattle stations, and his familiar bassy voice is heard in local commercials. Among the local commercials he voices are the commercials for Jerry's Hardware in Eugene and Springfield, Oregon—and Grover's Electric and Plumbing with multiple Northwest locations. He is featured in Super Smash Bros. Brawl for Wii as the game's announcer, Master Hand, and Crazy Hand.

Cashman  writes for several local newspapers in the Seattle region. He generally presents his comical view on a wide variety of subjects in a single article. Cashman has been in many advertisements for Taco Time. He appeared in Visioneers (2009) as a telethon host.

In January 2013, Cashman returned to Seattle TV with a new regional comedy show called The 206, along with his son Chris and former Almost Live! costar John Keister. Keister subsequently left the show in 2014. In 2015, a revamped version of the show, Up Late Northwest,  began airing in other markets as well as Seattle (Portland, Spokane, Eugene and Medford). The program is hosted by both Pat and Chris Cashman.

Filmography

Film

Television

Video games

References

External links

Pat Cashman website
Pat Cashman's booking agent's Web site
Pat Cashman fan website
The (206) official site

Living people
1950 births
People from Bend, Oregon
Comedians from Oregon
American male video game actors
American male voice actors
21st-century American male actors
20th-century American male actors